Joseph David Low (born 20 February 2002) is a Welsh professional footballer who plays as a centre-back for Walsall on loan from Bristol City.

Club career
Low joined the youth academy of Bristol City, and worked his way up all their youth categories. In February 2019, he had a short loan with Dorchester Town. Then in March 2019, he had another short loan spell with Frome Town. He spent the 2019-20 winter on loan with Yate Town, where he scored one goal in 12 appearances. 

On 10 August 2020, Low signed his first professional contract with his parent club Bristol City. He then moved to Eastleigh on loan at the beginning of the 2021-22 season, but was recalled to Bristol City after several strong performances. He made his professional debut as a late substitute with Bristol City in a 1–1 EFL Championship tie with Middlesbrough on 5 November 2022.

On 4 January 2023, Low signed for League Two club Walsall on loan until the end of the 2022–23 season.

International career
Of Welsh descent through his father, Low is a youth international for Wales and has been called up to the U19s. On 14 March 2023 he was called up to the Wales national under-21 football team

Personal life
Low is the son of the retired footballer and Wales youth international Josh Low.

Career statistics

References

External links
 
  Aylesbury United profile

2002 births
Living people
People from South Gloucestershire District
Welsh footballers
Wales youth international footballers
English footballers
English people of Welsh descent
Association football defenders
Bristol City F.C. players
Dorchester Town F.C. players
Frome Town F.C. players
Yate Town F.C. players
Eastleigh F.C. players
Walsall F.C. players
English Football League players
National League (English football) players
Southern Football League players